This article provides a collection of statewide public opinion polls that were conducted relating to the 2008 United States presidential election.

Opinion polling

Alabama
9 electoral votes(Republican in 2000 & 2004)

Four-way race

Alaska
3 electoral votes(Republican in 2000 & 2004)

Three-way race

Arizona
10 electoral votes(Republican in 2000 & 2004)

Four-way race

Arkansas
6 electoral votes(Republican in 2000 & 2004)

Four-way race

California
55 electoral votes(Democrat in 2000 & 2004)

Four-way race

Colorado
9 electoral votes(Republican in 2000 & 2004)

Four-way race

Five-way race

Connecticut
7 electoral votes(Democrat in 2000 & 2004)

Four-way race

Delaware
3 electoral votes(Democrat in 2000 & 2004)

District of Columbia
3 electoral votes(Democrat in 2000 & 2004)

Florida
27 electoral votes(Republican in 2000 & 2004)

Three-way race

Four-way race

Five-way race

Georgia
15 electoral votes(Republican in 2000 & 2004)

Three-way race

Four-way race

Hawaii
4 electoral votes(Democrat in 2000 & 2004)

Idaho
4 electoral votes(Republican in 2000 & 2004)

Five-way race

Illinois
21 electoral votes(Democrat in 2000 & 2004)

Four-way race

Indiana
11 electoral votes(Republican in 2000 & 2004)

Three-way race

Four-way race

Iowa
7 electoral votes(Democrat in 2000)(Republican in 2004)

Four-way race

Kansas
6 electoral votes(Republican in 2000 & 2004)

Kentucky
8 electoral votes(Republican in 2000 & 2004)

Four-way race

Louisiana
9 electoral votes(Republican in 2000 & 2004)

Four-way race

Maine
4 electoral votes(Democrat in 2000 & 2004)

First congressional district

Second congressional district

Maryland
10 electoral votes(Democrat in 2000 & 2004)

Four-way race

Massachusetts
12 electoral votes(Democrat in 2000 & 2004)

Three-way race

Four-way race

Six-way race

Michigan
17 electoral votes(Democrat in 2000 & 2004)

Three-way race

Four-way race

Five-way race

Minnesota
10 electoral votes(Democrat in 2000 & 2004)

Four-way race

Mississippi
6 electoral votes(Republican in 2000 & 2004)

Missouri
11 electoral votes(Republican in 2000 & 2004)

Four-way race

Five-way race

Six-way race

Montana
3 electoral votes(Republican in 2000 & 2004)

Three-way race

Five-way race

‡ Ron Paul replaced Chuck Baldwin on the ballot in Montana.

Nebraska
5 electoral votes(Republican in 2000 & 2004)

Second congressional district

Nevada
5 electoral votes(Republican in 2000 & 2004)

Four-way race

Five-way race

Six-way race

New Hampshire
4 electoral votes(Republican in 2000)(Democrat in 2004)

Four-way race

Five-way race

New Jersey
15 electoral votes(Democrat in 2000 & 2004)

Four-way race

New Mexico
5 electoral votes(Democrat in 2000)(Republican in 2004)

Three-way race

Four-way race

Five-way race

New York 
31 electoral votes(Democrat in 2000 & 2004)

Four-way race

North Carolina
15 electoral votes(Republican in 2000 & 2004)

Three-way race

Four-way race

North Dakota
3 electoral votes(Republican in 2000 & 2004)

Ohio
20 electoral votes(Republican in 2000 & 2004)

Four-way race

Five-way race

Seven-way race

Eight-way race

Oklahoma
7 electoral votes(Republican in 2000 & 2004)

Four-way race

Oregon
7 electoral votes(Democrat in 2000 & 2004)

Three-way race

Four-way race

Pennsylvania
21 electoral votes(Democrat in 2000 & 2004)

Four-way race

Rhode Island

4 electoral votes(Democrat in 2000 & 2004)

South Carolina
8 electoral votes(Republican in 2000 & 2004)

Three-way race

Four-way race

South Dakota
3 electoral votes(Republican in 2000 & 2004)

Tennessee
11 electoral votes(Republican in 2000 & 2004)

Four-way race

Texas
34 electoral votes(Republican in 2000 & 2004)

Three-way race

Four-way race

Utah
5 electoral votes(Republican in 2000 & 2004)

Three-way race

Vermont
3 electoral votes(Democrat in 2000 & 2004)

Virginia
13 electoral votes(Republican in 2000 & 2004)

Four-way race

Five-way race

Six-way race

Washington
11 electoral votes(Democrat in 2000 & 2004)

Four-way race

West Virginia
5 electoral votes(Republican in 2000 & 2004)

Four-way race

Wisconsin
10 electoral votes(Democrat in 2000 & 2004)

Four-way race

Wyoming
3 electoral votes(Republican in 2000 & 2004)

See also
Nationwide opinion polling for the Democratic Party 2008 presidential candidates
Nationwide opinion polling for the Republican Party 2008 presidential candidates
Nationwide opinion polling for the United States presidential election, 2008
Statewide opinion polling for the Democratic Party presidential primaries, 2008
Statewide opinion polling for the Republican Party presidential primaries, 2008

Election Day projection

FINAL UPDATE: 22:32, 4 November 2008 (UTC)
 Data derived from Nate Silver's FiveThirtyEight.com weighted averages and statistical polling analysis, which determines what the best guess as to what will happen on Election Day is rather than what would happen if the election were held today. (Methodology)
 Each state is colored according to which candidate is currently projected to win, and both the state's total electoral votes and the winning candidate's projected margin of victory are listed.
 The actual result matches this map with the exceptions that Barack Obama won Indiana and Nebraska's second congressional district.

References

External links
FiveThirtyEight.com: Detailed analysis of state-by-state general election polling
Electoral-Vote.com
Pollster.com Graphic display of aggregated polls
Rasmussen Reports: Balance of Power Calculator
Real Clear Politics
Princeton Election Consortium
CNN's Electoral Map

Statewide

es:Sondeo de opinión para la elección presidencial de los Estados Unidos en 2008